St Mary's Church is a Roman Catholic church in Lanark, South Lanarkshire, Scotland.

The church building and presbytery are Category A listed buildings. Also listed in Category A is the L-shaped school building to the north of the west end of the church.

The entrance gates to the church grounds  and the Sisters of Charity convent, which form part of the St Mary's Church site, are Category C listed buildings.

In September 2011, the two-storey Hall that stood on Ladyacre Road was badly damaged by fire and was later demolished.

References

Lanark
Churches in South Lanarkshire
Category A listed buildings in South Lanarkshire
Roman Catholic churches in Scotland
1859 establishments in Scotland